Sarah Nabukalu Kiyimba is a businesswoman and hotel owner in Uganda. In 2012, the New Vision newspaper listed her among the wealthiest individuals in Uganda.

Businesses and investments

See also
List of wealthiest people in Uganda
 Lydia Oile
 Sophia Namutebi

References

External links
 Webpage of Brovad Hotel

Living people
Ganda people
21st-century Ugandan businesswomen
21st-century Ugandan businesspeople
People from Masaka District
People from Central Region, Uganda
Date of birth missing (living people)
Year of birth missing (living people)